Hays-Pitzer House is a historic home located near Martinsburg, Berkeley County, West Virginia. It is a two-story, five bay, Federal-style log and stone dwelling.  The log section of the house was built in 1775 and the stone section was built about 1800.

It was listed on the National Register of Historic Places in 1994.

References

Federal architecture in West Virginia
Houses completed in 1775
Houses in Berkeley County, West Virginia
Houses on the National Register of Historic Places in West Virginia
National Register of Historic Places in Berkeley County, West Virginia
Stone houses in West Virginia